"Hurricane" is a song by French DJ duo Ofenbach and English singer-songwriter Ella Henderson. It was released through Elektra France on 17 September 2021.

Background
In an Interview with Student Pocket Guide, the duo stated about the collaboration with Henderson: "We finished the first demo and sent it to Ella to check how she felt about it. It was during lockdown, so everything was done remotely then. When she sent us back her first try it was amazing. Since the track is powerful, her voice fit the vibe perfectly. It was a no brainer. She took it next level".

Content
Shelby Pinckard of The Nocturnal Times described "Hurricane" as "a heart-wrenching love story in the form of an upbeat dance-pop track that is sure to capture the hearts of all who hear it". It is written in the key of D minor, with a tempo of 126 beats per minute.

Track listing

Charts

Weekly charts

Year-end charts

Certifications

References

2021 songs
2021 singles
Ofenbach (DJs) songs
Ella Henderson songs
Elektra Records singles
Warner Music Group singles